Portland Township is one of sixteen townships in Cerro Gordo County, Iowa, USA.  As of the 2000 census, its population was 331.

Geography
The unincorporated community of Portland, a census-designated place, is located in the western part of the township, just north of the Winnebago River. The county seat, Mason City, borders the township to the northwest.

References

External links
 US-Counties.com
 City-Data.com

Townships in Cerro Gordo County, Iowa
Mason City, Iowa micropolitan area
Townships in Iowa